Jean Ker, Countess of Roxburghe, née Drummond (c.1585–1643) was a Scottish courtier, serving Anne of Denmark in Scotland and England.

Courtier and Governess
Jean or Jane Drummond was the daughter of Patrick Drummond, 3rd Lord Drummond and his first wife, Elizabeth Lindsay.

Drummond was a gentlewoman in the household of Anne of Denmark, described as her "familiar servitrix", and had care over the infant Prince Charles at Dunfermline Palace in 1602. She was with Anna of Denmark at Stirling Castle on 10 May 1603 when she quarrelled with the Master of Mar and Marie Stewart, Countess of Mar over the custody of Prince Henry and had a miscarriage.

England
In 1603, on the accession of James VI of Scotland to the throne of England (as James I), she accompanied Anne of Denmark to Stirling Castle to take custody of her son, Prince Henry, and then to London. Drummond bought linen for the Queen's costume and lace for her ruffs in England. When the court was at Winchester in September 1603 the queen ordered fabrics for new clothes for Drummond and other women who had made the journey from Scotland, including Anne Livingstone, Margaret Stewart, and Margaret Hartsyde. In the years before her marriage, Anna of Denmark also gave her gifts of her old clothes.

In November 1603 the Spanish ambassador, the Count of Villamediana, invited the Duke of Lennox and the Earl of Mar to dinner. According to Arbella Stuart, he asked them "to bring the Scottish ladies for he was desirous to see some natural beauties." These included "my Cousin Drummond" and Anna Hay with Elizabeth Carey, and they were given presents of gold chains and Spanish leather gloves.

Jean Drummond and Anna Hay, later Countess of Winton, as important members of the queen's household had footmen attendants allocated to them, Andrew Robinson and George Baron. Robinson was later replaced by Andrew Drummond, probably a relation of Jean.

The Privy Council suggested economies in the royal households by reducing the amount of food allowed in October 1605. Food allowances were assigned to individual members of the household in "messes" and "dishes". Jean Drummond's allowance was a "diet of 7 dishes" and this might be reduced to a "chamber mess of two" which the other ladies at court received. Evidently Drummond enjoyed special favour and had a number of servants and followers.

In 1607, a marriage between her and Archibald Campbell, 7th Earl of Argyll was discussed. She corresponded with her cousin Duncan Campbell of Glenorchy about the proposals, expressing some reluctance to be the earl's second wife, "I do not esteem the place of a second wife so much, his estate being as it is". The plans were abandoned. In May 1608 she wrote to the king's advocate in Scotland Thomas Hamilton about the queen's business and the case of the queen's servant Margaret Hartsyde who was on trial in Edinburgh for stealing the queen's jewels.

In June 1609 Drummond and Lady Fleetwood stayed at the bedside of her kinsman and servant of the queen David Abercromby who was dying and he declared his will to them. Abercromby's role in the household had involved dealing with the goldsmith George Heriot for the queen's jewels.

Cecily Bulstrode and Bridget Markham, two of the queen's ladies in waiting, also died in the summer of 1609. In October the Queen's groom of the robes died of plague. At the end of November 1610 one of Drummond's maids died from the plague in her lodgings at Greenwich Palace and the queen returned to Whitehall for fear of infection. Soon after the surveyor of royal buildings Simon Basil was asked to demolish "Mrs Drummond's lodgings".

Drummond held a position of responsibility in the queen's household, and wrote signed financial documents, including on 24 July 1609 a warrant to Thomas Knyvet to pay £500 to the queen's jeweller George Heriot, and in 1612 a warrant for lifetime payments to the queen's four French musicians, the lutenists; Louis Richart, Camille Prevost, Claude Olivier, and Peter de la Mere.

Gatekeeping the Queen's favour
As a close companion of the queen, Jean Drummond was able to intercede with her for the benefit of others. Arbella Stuart wrote to her with thanks for the queen's favour and the hearing of her suit, which Drummond had presented to the queen in a good light. Arbella hoped that Jean would move the queen to ensure the king would "weigh my cause aright". Drummond wrote to Arbella that Anna of Denmark had passed her petition to King James. He gave no answer except to say that Arbella she "had eaten of the forbidden tree." Arbella Stuart sent Drummond, who was Mistress of the Robes, gloves which she had embroidered herself, to be given to the queen. Anne of Denmark sent Arbella a gift, intended according to Drummond, to witness the continuance of her favour.

Jean Drummond wrote to the King's Advocate in Scotland Thomas Hamilton in May 1608, mentioning that she had told the queen that King James had compensated him for his silver mine at Hilderston. She congratulated him on this windfall payment and on the birth of a daughter. She had discussed whether Anne of Denmark would be a godparent, and Anne said had said not. Hamilton's daughter was christened Anna, after the queen. Drummond wrote; "I acquentit hir Maiesti with your gud luk; for the king no shuner gaive you mony for your mynd, bot God send you a chyld to bestow it on. Hir Maiesti was wel contentit that you gaive your dochter that neme, bot says sho wil not allow hir for hir goddochtir becaus you did not aduertis hir, that sho micht have don to you as sho had don to uthers".

In December 1608 the disgraced Lord Balmerino believed that Drummond was acting in his favour. He was found guilty of treason in March 1609 and sentenced to be beheaded, quartered, and demeaned as a traitor. The sentence was not carried out, due to the intercession of Anne of Denmark at the instance of Jean Drummond.

Spanish diplomats also saw Jean Drummond as a route to influence the queen, and she was recommended by the ambassador Juan de Tassis and received a Spanish pension. Her pension of 3000 felipes was usually paid in July. Tassis and the Constable of Castile gave her an aigrette studded with 75 diamonds in 1604, made in Brussels by Jean Guiset. The Constable was hesitant about awarding a pension to a woman. In 1611 the Spanish ambassador Alonso de Velasco wrote that a Catholic priest was concealed at the court of Anne of Denmark, posing as Drummond's servant. On 29 July 1612, a Spanish diplomat, the Marquis de Flores spoke with her at Somerset House after his audience with the queen. Drummond pressed him for further information, suggesting that he planned to continue negotiations about the marriage of Princess Elizabeth.

In November 1611 Drummond compared the queen's reputation to be content among "harmless pictures in a paltry gallery" with the Earl of Salisbury's "great employments in fair rooms". Her remark draws attention to Anne of Denmark's collection, and contrasts the smaller and more private spaces housing the queen's pictures with the halls and presence chambers where public statecraft was enacted.

In 1612 and 1613 Drummond was involved in the affairs of her friend Anne Livingstone, who was trying to have her husband Alexander Seton of Foulstruther recognised as Earl of Eglinton. Drummond wrote to Anne Livingstone of developments during the queen's progress to Bath following the wedding of Princess Elizabeth and Frederick V of the Palatinate. She successfully persuaded the queen to intercede with King James in her friend's favour.

Countess of Roxburghe
She married Robert Ker, 1st Lord Roxburghe (later created Earl of Roxburghe), on 3 February 1614; the wedding was celebrated at Somerset House and attended by the king and queen. There was a masque Hymen's Triumph written by Samuel Daniel. John Chamberlain had heard that the queen would pay for the festivities and a "Masque of Maids, if they may be found", but no more than £500 for a wedding-gown and a marriage bed because "her maid Drummond is rich enough otherwise, as well in wealth as in virtue and favour." The wedding feast and Daniel's masque was said to have cost the queen £3000, and it was an opportunity for her to show off the recent refurbishment of Somerset House. The masque and its setting in a courtyard of the palace on the Strand was described by the ambassador of Savoy, Giovanni Battista Gabaleone.

There was a reception with a play on the day after for the Lord Mayor of London, Thomas Myddleton and the aldermen. There was another celebratory feast on 16 February. The Earl of Rutland gave a wedding present of a gilt bowl and cover and a pair of candlesticks worth £61.

After her marriage she continued to sign letters as "Jane Drummond". She would not have styled herself "Jean Ker". In early modern Scotland married women did not usually adopt their husband's surnames.

An Italian poet at the court of Denmark, Antonio Galli or Gatti wrote sonnets in her praise. Anne of Denmark had a version of her portrait at Oatlands. Mary Seton, the former maid of Mary, Queen of Scots, wrote to her in September 1614.

She was with the queen during her illness at Greenwich Palace in May 1615. She wrote to her husband on 10 May 1615 that he was to thank the king for the letter, and that the physician Theodore de Mayerne was writing to the king with details of the queen's sickness. Anne's foot was swollen and she had been sitting a chair all day long.

In July 1615 she was bought a white gelding horse for £16-10s in place of her old grey horse which was blind and lame. In March 1616 King James gave her £3000 in recognition of her long service to the queen. In January 1617 she was godmother to Elizabeth Gordon, daughter of Sir Robert Gordon of Gordonstoun and Louisa Gordon whose mother Geneviève Petau de Maulette is said to have taught French to Elizabeth of Bohemia. The other godparents were the Earl of Hertford and Lucy Russell, Countess of Bedford.

Dismissed
In 1617, Queen Anne forced the countess to retire from court after it was discovered that her husband sought to be appointed Lord Chamberlain to Prince Charles (later Charles I), without either of them informing the queen. One newsletter said that she had lost her place as "groom of the stole" to a daughter of the Countess of Shrewsbury, Elizabeth Grey, Countess of Kent, (Lady Ruthin}. Another writer thought that, "the Lady of Ruthen, the Lady Walsingham, and Mrs Southwell" were in competition to succeed her, but a daughter of the Lord Montacute, Mary, Lady St John, might be favoured.

On 10 May 1617 Drummond signed a receipt as "Jane Roxbrough", for a £500 installment of the king's gift of £3,000 to her "in consideration of long and faithful service done to the Queen, as one of the ladies of the bedchamber to her Majesty." Lord Roxburghe came to the queen's household at Oatlands in August 1617 and she left the court. Her dismissal particularly alarmed the ambassadors of Spain and Venice, who had relied on the Catholic countess as a confidante to the queen.

Lady Anne Clifford mentions that she was pregnant and travelled to Scotland in a litter. Lucy, Countess of Bedford, was upset that her friend had returned to Scotland, and in October 1617 wrote to Lady Cornwallis that Roxburghe's absence in Scotland "makes me perfectly hate the court". Anne of Denmark frowned and "looked big" at Roxburghe's allies

In Scotland
An account of her and her husband's expenses from 1619 to 1630 runs to 550 pages, and mentions her residence at East Roxburgh, a townhouse in Edinburgh's Canongate, and Broxmouth near Dunbar.

She gave clothes to her friend Margaret Seton, Lady Dudhope, a daughter of David Seton of Parbroath, and visited her at Dudhope in Dundee. Her husband John Scrimgeour, Constable of Dundee ordered a pair of pistols for Lord Roxburghe from a gunsmith in Dundee and the countess gave him a tip of £3, known as "drinksilver". Her step-daughter Isobel Ker was married to Margaret Seton's son, James Scrimgeour, later 2nd Viscount Dudhope.

The household book records spices and food seasonings such as cinnamon, mace, ginger, and sugar almonds bought in Edinburgh and sent to East Roxburgh, as were materials and ribbons for clothing. She bought textiles for clothes for herself, her husband, her nieces and nephews, and servants. On 21 July 1619 she gave six shillings to a boy walking on stilts on Soutra Hill who said he was going all the way to London.

In a letter of May 1622 she mentions her fear of sailing across the River Forth from Leith, which she had never done before, to attend a christening in Fife. However, an earlier journey to Dudhope Castle in 1619 involving crossing the Forth is detailed in the account book. In July 1623 she travelled with the Viscount Lauderdale to Drummond Castle in Strathearn to stay for a month with her brother John Drummond, 2nd Earl of Perth.

Royal Governess Again

In 1630, the by-now Charles I had wished to appoint the countess as governess to his son, the Prince of Wales (later Charles II) but this was objected to on the grounds of her religion and the Countess of Dorset was appointed instead. A year later however, Lady Roxburghe was appointed governess to Princess Mary and later to Prince Henry and Princess Elizabeth in 1641.

In 1642, the countess accompanied Princess Mary to The Hague after the latter's marriage to Prince William of Orange. On the voyage back from the Netherlands a ship of the royal fleet sank in bad weather. A silk dress belonging to the countess was discovered in 2014 in the wreck off the Dutch island of Texel.

On her return to England, the countess was replaced as the governess to Mary Princess Royal by Lady Stanhope. She resumed her governess-ship to Henry and Elizabeth in 1642, and hosted Lilias Drummond, a daughter of the Earl of Perth, at her house in London, who married James Murray, 2nd Earl of Tullibardine in May 1643. The older sister of Lilias, also Jean Drummond, and later Countess of Wigtown, was a nurse to royal children, as was another Jean Drummond, the widow of Secretary Murray and mother of Anne, Lady Halkett.

She died on 7 October 1643 and was buried in Holyrood Abbey.

Her husband's 1650 will mentions a chain of diamonds and rubies, with a "picture case" or locket containing the miniature portrait of Anne of Denmark, set with diamonds, the central larger stone was heart shaped. He owned a "valentine set with diamonds" with a crown and the picture of Charles I of England as Duke of York. These jewels had probably been gifts to his wife from the queen.

Family
Her first son died in 1616. A daughter was christened at Greenwich in April 1616, Anna of Denmark and Lucy, Countess of Bedford were godparents.

Her son Henry Kerr married Margaret Hay, a daughter of the Earl of Erroll. Henry Kerr joined the supporters of the Scottish covenant who opposed the king. On 20 May 1639, Jean Roxburghe wrote from Whitehall to Walter Balcanquhall, Dean of Durham, expressing her disappointment over this defection. Henry Kerr died in 1643, leaving four daughters, Jean, Margaret, and Sophia (born after his death). His widow, Margaret Hay married the Earl of Cassilis.

References
Payne, Helen – Ker/Kerr; née Drummond, Jane/Jean, countess of Roxburghe (b. in or before 1585, d. 1643), courtier – ODNB

1580s births
1643 deaths
Daughters of barons
Jean
Scottish governesses
Ladies of the Bedchamber
Scottish ladies-in-waiting
Scottish countesses
Scottish Roman Catholics
Year of birth uncertain
17th-century Scottish educators
16th-century Scottish people
16th-century Scottish women
17th-century Scottish people
17th-century Scottish women
Court of James VI and I
Household of Anne of Denmark